John Ronald Gower (7 April 1912 – 18 November 2007) was a captain in the Royal Navy who fought in the Second World War. In the post-war period he commanded the destroyer  when it carried out experiments in waters contaminated by the nuclear fallout of two nuclear explosions in Operation Mosaic, and when it sank the Egyptian frigate  Domiat in the Red Sea on 1 November 1956.

Biography

Early life and career 
John Ronald Gower was born on 7 April 1912 in Nairobi, Kenya, where his father was a judge. He had a younger brother, Derek, who was killed in the Normandy landings during the Second World War. His youngest brother, Dicky followed his father into the Colonial Service, and became the father of David Gower, who was captain of the English national cricket team. An ancestor, the eighteenth-century explorer and naval officer Erasmus Gower, was in command the sloop  when he was shipwrecked on the coast of Patagonia in 1770; Gower would later command the ship's namesake.

Gower joined the Royal Navy in 1926, entering as a cadet in the Royal Naval College, Dartmouth. Between 1929 and 1932, he served as a midshipman on the heavy cruiser  with the 1st Cruiser Squadron of the Mediterranean Fleet, and then on destroyer . He completed the sub lieutenant's course, and was promoted to the rank effect 1 May 1933. After service on the battleship  , he was promoted to lieutenant  on 1 September 1935. He then served on the flagship of the Mediterranean Fleet, the battleship .

Second World War 
In June 1940 Gower took part in the Dunkirk evacuation as part of the crew of the minesweeper . He next joined the crew of the destroyer , and participated in the Lofoten Islands Raid in February 1941, and the first of the Arctic Convoys. In April 1942 he assumed command of the destroyer . He was promoted to  lieutenant commander  on 1 September 1943, and  assumed command of the destroyer , again participating in Arctic convoy duty.

In February 1944 Gower participated in the rescue of the submarine , which had been badly damaged while it was recharging its batteries on the surface off the coast of Norway, and after identifying the submarine he managed to take it in tow back to Britain, despite coming under air attack. On 6 June 1944, he participated in the Normandy landing, with Swift bombarding targets on Sword beach. When the Norwegian destroyer  was hit by a torpedo on D-Day, despite orders not to abandon the position or to launch lifeboats, he allowed Swift to drift towards the survivors, and was thus able to rescue 80 members of its crew.

On 23 June, returning from a night patrol hunting some E-boats, Swift  bumped into an acoustic mine that exploded and sank the ship in shallow water. For his actions during the Normandy campaign, Gower was awarded the Distinguished Service Cross. His next command was the destroyer , a ship belonging to the 17th Flotilla of Home Fleet. It patrolled the English Channel and escorted convoys in the Arctic. In January 1945 he took part in Operation Spellbinder, the return of the Royal Navy units in the southern waters of Norway. During this operation he was twice mentioned in dispatches.

Post-war activity 
After the end of the Second World War Gower served as a course officer at the Royal Naval College, which was then at Eaton Hall, Cheshire. In 1948 he married  Aimée Joan Winder, who bore him four children, two boys and two girls. She died in 2000. He was deputy commander of the training cruiser  between 1949 and 1951, and commander of the Royal Naval College, Greenwich between 1951 and 1953. He attended the Joint Services Staff College course in 1953 and 1954, and was the Royal Navy's  Director of PT and Sports from 1954 to 1956. He was promoted to captain on 30 June 1953.

After duty as director of the Torpedo Boat training school Portsmouth between 1954 and 1955, he assumed  command of the destroyer  in 1956. Diana participated in Operation Mosaic, a series of nuclear experiments in the southern hemisphere, including in the Monte Bello Islands in Western Australia. No special essential protective clothing was  issued. Australian  authorities denied the Diana permission to dock at Fremantle afterwards, as they considered the ship extremely contaminated. Many members of the crew became ill. During the Suez crisis he was in command of Diana when it sank  the Egyptian frigate  Domiat in the Red Sea on 1 November 1956. He  was the naval attaché  at the British embassy in Santiago, Chile from 1958 to 1960, and then commanded the boys' training school  from 1960 until he retired from active service on 28 August 1962.

Gower went to live in Scotland, where he worked for seven years with Sir Billy Butlin before opening a business selling caravans in Belmont, Ayr. He later settled in Aldeburgh, Suffolk, where he died on 18 November 2007.

In the media 
The writer John Winton, a former lieutenant commander of the Royal Navy who worked as a necrologist at The Daily Telegraph for fourteen years, was a student of Gower, and used him as a model for the character of Lieutenant Commander Robert Badger, the protagonist of his series of novels We Joined the Navy. Such novels were written under the pseudonym of "The Artful Bodger". The character of Robert Badger, in the film adaptation, We Joined the Navy  (1963), was played by Kenneth More. Between 1929 and 1932 Gower wrote the three volumes of the series Midshipman's Journal.

Notes

1912 births
2007 deaths
Royal Navy officers of World War II
Recipients of the Distinguished Service Cross (United Kingdom)
Graduates of Britannia Royal Naval College